FabricLive.61 is a 2012 DJ mix album by Pinch. The album was released as part of the FabricLive Mix Series. The mix signalled a shift away from Pinch's earlier dubstep sound, moving towards house and techno.

Track list

References

External links

Fabric: FabricLive.61

Fabric (club) albums
2012 compilation albums